Brachyurophis morrisi, also known as the Arnhem shovel-nosed snake, is a species of venomous burrowing snake that is endemic to Australia. The specific epithet morrisi honours author and naturalist Ian James Morris for his contributions to knowledge of the animals of the Northern Territory, who first collected the species in 1970.

Description
The species grows to an average of about 23 cm in length. It is orange-brown in colour and unbanded apart from a dark band across the nape. The body scales are often dark-edged.

Behaviour
The species is oviparous. It feeds on reptile eggs.

Distribution and habitat
The species’ range is limited to northern Arnhem Land in the tropical Top End of the Northern Territory, where it occurs in woodland dominated by Eucalyptus miniata.

References

 
morrisi
Snakes of Australia
Endemic fauna of Australia
Reptiles of the Northern Territory
Reptiles described in 1998
Arnhem Land tropical savanna